Southampton Township is a township in Burlington County, in the U.S. state of New Jersey. As of the 2020 United States census, the township's population was 10,317, a decrease of 147 (−1.4%) from the 2010 census count of 10,464, which in turn reflected an increase of 76 (+0.7%) from the 10,388 counted in the 2000 census.

What is now Southampton was originally incorporated as Coaxen Township by an act of the New Jersey Legislature on March 10, 1845, from portions of Northampton Township (now known as Mount Holly Township). The name lasted for about three weeks when it was renamed Southampton Township on April 1, 1845. As the population increased, portions of the township were taken to form Pemberton Township (March 10, 1846), Shamong Township (February 19, 1852), Lumberton Township (March 14, 1860), Woodland Township (March 7, 1866) and Tabernacle Township (March 22, 1901).

Geography
According to the U.S. Census Bureau, the township had a total area of 44.44 square miles (115.10 km2), including 43.96 square miles (113.85 km2) of land and 0.48 square miles (1.25 km2) of water (1.08%). The township is located within the New Jersey Pine Barrens.

Leisuretowne (2010 Census population of 3,582) is an unincorporated community and census-designated place (CDP) located within Southampton Township. Vincentown is an unincorporated area and ZIP Code 08088 within portions of the township, while other unincorporated communities, localities and place names located partially or completely within the township include Beaverville, Buddtown, Burrs Mill, Chairville, Crescent Heights, Ewansville, Ewingville, Hampton Lakes, Medford Park, Oak Shade, Red Lion, Retreat and Sandtown.

The township borders the Burlington County municipalities of Eastampton Township, Lumberton Township, Medford Township, Pemberton Township, Tabernacle Township and Woodland Township.

The township is one of 56 South Jersey municipalities that are included within the New Jersey Pinelands National Reserve, a protected natural area of unique ecology covering , that has been classified as a United States Biosphere Reserve and established by Congress in 1978 as the nation's first National Reserve. Part of the township is included in the state-designated Pinelands Area, which includes portions of Burlington County, along with areas in Atlantic, Camden, Cape May, Cumberland, Gloucester and Ocean counties.

Climate

Demographics

2010 census

The Census Bureau's 2006–2010 American Community Survey showed that (in 2010 inflation-adjusted dollars) median household income was $51,713 (with a margin of error of +/− $3,072) and the median family income was $73,598 (+/− $11,729). Males had a median income of $57,500 (+/− $8,015) versus $39,472 (+/− $4,560) for females. The per capita income for the borough was $34,493 (+/− $1,869). About 3.1% of families and 5.2% of the population were below the poverty line, including 6.1% of those under age 18 and 8.4% of those age 65 or over.

2000 census
As of the 2000 United States census there were 10,388 people, 4,574 households, and 3,046 families residing in the township. The racial makeup of the township was 97.09% White, 1.20% African American, 0.28% Native American, 0.63% Asian, 0.30% from other races, and 0.50% from two or more races. Hispanic or Latino of any race were 1.29% of the population.

There were 4,574 households, out of which 19.8% had children under the age of 18 living with them, 57.2% were married couples living together, 6.8% had a female householder with no husband present, and 33.4% were non-families. 29.9% of all households were made up of individuals, and 21.3% had someone living alone who was 65 years of age or older.  The average household size was 2.26 and the average family size was 2.79.

In the township the population was spread out, with 17.8% under the age of 18, 4.8% from 18 to 24, 21.2% from 25 to 44, 24.5% from 45 to 64, and 31.7% who were 65 years of age or older.  The median age was 50 years. For every 100 females, there were 87.8 males.  For every 100 females age 18 and over, there were 85.2 males.

The median income for a household in the township was $44,419, and the median income for a family was $57,419. Males had a median income of $45,785 versus $30,134 for females. The per capita income for the township was $26,977.  About 2.6% of families and 3.9% of the population were below the poverty line, including 4.8% of those under age 18 and 2.5% of those age 65 or over.

Government

Local government
Southampton Township is governed under the Township form of New Jersey municipal government, one of 141 municipalities (of the 564) statewide that use this form, the second-most commonly used form of government in the state. The Township Committee is comprised of five members, who are elected directly by the voters at-large in partisan elections to serve three-year terms of office on a staggered basis, with either one or two seats coming up for election each year as part of the November general election in a three-year cycle. At an annual reorganization meeting, the Township Committee selects one of its members to serve as Mayor for the year.

, members of the Southampton Township Committee are Mayor Michael S. Mikulski II (R, term on committee and as mayor ends December 31, 2022), Deputy Mayor Ronald J. Heston (R, term on committee ends 2024; term as deputy mayor ends 2022), William J. Raftery (R, 2024), Elizabeth H. Rossell (R, 2022) and James F. Young Sr. (R, 2023).

Federal, state and county representation
Southampton Township is located in the 3rd Congressional District and is part of New Jersey's 8th state legislative district.

 

Burlington County is governed by a Board of County Commissioners comprised of five members who are chosen at-large in partisan elections to serve three-year terms of office on a staggered basis, with either one or two seats coming up for election each year; at an annual reorganization meeting, the board selects a director and deputy director from among its members to serve a one-year term. , Burlington County's Commissioners are
Director Felicia Hopson (D, Willingboro Township, term as commissioner ends December 31, 2024; term as director ends 2023),
Deputy Director Tom Pullion (D, Edgewater Park, term as commissioner and as deputy director ends 2023),
Allison Eckel (D, Medford, 2025),
Daniel J. O'Connell (D, Delran Township, 2024) and 
Balvir Singh (D, Burlington Township, 2023). 
Burlington County's Constitutional Officers are
County Clerk Joanne Schwartz (R, Southampton Township, 2023)
Sheriff James H. Kostoplis (D, Bordentown, 2025) and 
Surrogate Brian J. Carlin (D, Burlington Township, 2026).

Politics
As of March 2011, there were a total of 7,558 registered voters in Southampton Township, of which 1,879 (24.9% vs. 33.3% countywide) were registered as Democrats, 2,929 (38.8% vs. 23.9%) were registered as Republicans and 2,747 (36.3% vs. 42.8%) were registered as Unaffiliated. There were 3 voters registered as Libertarians or Greens. Among the township's 2010 Census population, 72.2% (vs. 61.7% in Burlington County) were registered to vote, including 85.6% of those ages 18 and over (vs. 80.3% countywide).

In the 2012 presidential election, Republican Mitt Romney received 3,166 votes here (54.5% vs. 40.2% countywide), ahead of Democrat Barack Obama with 2,547 votes (43.8% vs. 58.1%) and other candidates with 54 votes (0.9% vs. 1.0%), among the 5,814 ballots cast by the township's 7,758 registered voters, for a turnout of 74.9% (vs. 74.5% in Burlington County). In the 2008 presidential election, Republican John McCain received 3,317 votes here (53.2% vs. 39.9% countywide), ahead of Democrat Barack Obama with 2,791 votes (44.8% vs. 58.4%) and other candidates with 75 votes (1.2% vs. 1.0%), among the 6,233 ballots cast by the township's 7,815 registered voters, for a turnout of 79.8% (vs. 80.0% in Burlington County). In the 2004 presidential election, Republican George W. Bush received 3,359 votes here (55.3% vs. 46.0% countywide), ahead of Democrat John Kerry with 2,613 votes (43.0% vs. 52.9%) and other candidates with 56 votes (0.9% vs. 0.8%), among the 6,077 ballots cast by the township's 7,712 registered voters, for a turnout of 78.8% (vs. 78.8% in the whole county).

In the 2013 gubernatorial election, Republican Chris Christie received 2,998 votes here (77.2% vs. 61.4% countywide), ahead of Democrat Barbara Buono with 762 votes (19.6% vs. 35.8%) and other candidates with 54 votes (1.4% vs. 1.2%), among the 3,883 ballots cast by the township's 7,765 registered voters, yielding a 50.0% turnout (vs. 44.5% in the county). In the 2009 gubernatorial election, Republican Chris Christie received 2,500 votes here (58.0% vs. 47.7% countywide), ahead of Democrat Jon Corzine with 1,556 votes (36.1% vs. 44.5%), Independent Chris Daggett with 180 votes (4.2% vs. 4.8%) and other candidates with 34 votes (0.8% vs. 1.2%), among the 4,307 ballots cast by the township's 7,733 registered voters, yielding a 55.7% turnout (vs. 44.9% in the county).

Education
The Southampton Township Schools serve public school students in kindergarten through eighth grade. As of the 2018–19 school year, the district, comprised of three schools, had an enrollment of 734 students and 70.5 classroom teachers (on an FTE basis), for a student–teacher ratio of 10.4:1. Schools in the district (with 2018–19 enrollment data from the National Center for Education Statistics) are 
Southampton School #1 with 234 students in grades K–2, 
Southampton School #2 with 230 students in grades 3–5 and 
Southampton School #3 with 254 students in grades 6–8.

Public school students from Southampton Township in ninth through twelfth grades attend Seneca High School, which also serves students in ninth through twelfth grade from Shamong Township, Tabernacle Township and Woodland Township. The school is part of the Lenape Regional High School District, which also serves students from Evesham Township, Medford Lakes, Medford Township and Mount Laurel Township. As of the 2018–19 school year, the high school had an enrollment of 1,137 students and 109.5 classroom teachers (on an FTE basis), for a student–teacher ratio of 10.4:1.

Students from Southampton Township, and from all of Burlington County, are eligible to attend the Burlington County Institute of Technology, a countywide public school district that serves the vocational and technical education needs of students at the high school and post-secondary level at its campuses in Medford and Westampton Township.

Transportation

Roads and highways

The two main highways serving Southampton are U.S. Route 206, which runs north–south, and Route 70, which is oriented east–west, which intersect at the Red Lion Circle. Route 38 and County Route 530 also cross the township.

Public transportation
NJ Transit provides bus service in the township on the 317 route between Asbury Park and Philadelphia.

Wineries
 DeMastro Vineyards

Notable people

People who were born in, residents of, or otherwise closely associated with Southampton Township include:
 Albert Cooper (1904–1993), soccer goalkeeper who earned two cap with the U.S. national team in 1928
 Kyle Criscuolo (born 1992), ice hockey forward who has played in the NHL for the Buffalo Sabres
 Samuel A. Dobbins (1814–1905), represented New Jersey's 2nd congressional district in the United States House of Representatives from 1873 to 1877
 Brad Ecklund (1922–2010), center who played five seasons in the NFL
 Job H. Lippincott (1842–1900), United States Attorney for the District of New Jersey and Associate Justice of the New Jersey Supreme Court from 1893 to 1900
 Chauncey Morehouse (1902–1980), jazz drummer
 Jim Saxton (born 1943), Congressman from 1984 to 2009

References

External links

Southampton Township website
Southampton Township Schools

Vincent Fire Company
Data for the Southampton Township Schools, National Center for Education Statistics
Seneca High School

 
1845 establishments in New Jersey
Populated places in the Pine Barrens (New Jersey)
Populated places established in 1845
Township form of New Jersey government
Townships in Burlington County, New Jersey